Mixed-sex education, also known as mixed-gender education, co-education, or coeducation (abbreviated to co-ed or coed), is a system of education where males and females are educated together. Whereas single-sex education was more common up to the 19th century, mixed-sex education has since become standard in many cultures, particularly in Western countries. Single-sex education remains prevalent in many Muslim countries. The relative merits of both systems have been the subject of debate.

The world's oldest co-educational school is thought to be Archbishop Tenison's Church of England High School, Croydon, established in 1714 in the United Kingdom, which admitted boys and girls from its opening onwards. This has always been a day school only.

The world's oldest co-educational both day and boarding school is Dollar Academy, a junior and senior school for males and females from ages 5 to 18 in Scotland, United Kingdom. From its opening in 1818, the school admitted both boys and girls of the parish of Dollar and the surrounding area. The school continues in existence to the present day with around 1,250 pupils.

The first co-educational college to be founded was Oberlin Collegiate Institute in Oberlin, Ohio. It opened on 3 December 1833, with 44 students, including 29 men and 15 women. Fully equal status for women did not arrive until 1837, and the first three women to graduate with bachelor's degrees did so in 1840. By the late 20th century, many institutions of higher learning that had been exclusively for men or women had become coeducational.

History
In early civilizations, people were educated informally: primarily within the household. As time progressed, education became more structured and formal. Women often had very few rights when education started to become a more important aspect of civilization. Efforts of the ancient Greek and Chinese societies focused primarily on the education of males. In ancient Rome, the availability of education was gradually extended to women, but they were taught separately from men. The early Christians and medieval Europeans continued this trend, and single-sex schools for the privileged classes prevailed through the Reformation period.

In the 16th century, at the Council of Trent, the Roman Catholic church reinforced the establishment of free elementary schools for children of all classes. The concept of universal elementary education, regardless of sex, had been created. After the Reformation, coeducation was introduced in western Europe, when certain Protestant groups urged that boys and girls should be taught to read the Bible. The practice became very popular in northern England, Scotland, and colonial New England, where young children, both male and female, attended dame schools. In the late 18th century, girls gradually were admitted to town schools. The Society of Friends in England, as well as in the United States, pioneered coeducation as they did universal education, and in Quaker settlements in the British colonies, boys and girls commonly attended school together. The new free public elementary, or common schools, which after the American Revolution supplanted church institutions, were almost always coeducational, and by 1900 most public high schools were coeducational as well. In the late 19th and early 20th centuries, coeducation grew much more widely accepted. In Great Britain, Germany, and the Soviet Union, the education of girls and boys in the same classes became an approved practice.

Australia
In Australia, there is a trend towards increased coeducational schooling with new coeducational schools opening, few new single-sex schools opening and existing single-sex schools combining or opening their doors to the opposite gender.

China
The first mixed-sex institution of higher learning in China was the Nanjing Higher Normal Institute, which was renamed National Central University and Nanjing University. For millennia in China, public schools, especially public higher learning schools, were for men. Generally, only schools established by zōng zú (宗族, gens) were for both male and female students. Some schools, such as Li Zhi's school during the Ming dynasty and Yuan Mei's school during the Qing Dynasty, enrolled both male and female students. In the 1910s, women's universities were established, such as Ginling Women's University and Peking Girls' Higher Normal School, but there was no coeducation in higher learning schools.

Tao Xingzhi, the Chinese advocator of mixed-sex education, proposed The Audit Law for Women Students (規定女子旁聽法案, Guī Dìng Nǚ Zi Páng Tīng Fǎ Àn) at the meeting of Nanjing Higher Normal School held on December seventh, 1919. He also proposed that the university recruit female students. The idea was supported by the president Kuo Ping-Wen, academic director Liu Boming, and such famous professors as Lu Zhiwei and Yang Xingfo, but opposed by many famous men of the time. The meeting passed the law and decided to recruit women students next year. Nanjing Higher Normal School enrolled eight Chinese female students in 1920. In the same year Peking University also began to allow women students to audit classes. One of the most notable female students of that time was Chien-Shiung Wu.

In 1949, the People's Republic of China was founded. The Chinese government pursued a policy of moving towards co-education and nearly all schools and universities have become mixed-sex. In recent years, some female or single-sex schools have again emerged for special vocational training needs, but equal rights for education still applies to all citizens.

Indigenous Muslim populations in China, the Hui and Salars, find coeducation to be controversial, owing to Islamic ideas on gender roles. On the other hand, the Muslim Uyghurs have not historically objected to coeducation.

France
Admission to the Sorbonne was opened to girls in 1860. The baccalauréat became gender-blind in 1924, giving equal chances to all girls in applying to any universities. Mixed-sex education became mandatory for primary schools in 1957 and for all universities in 1975.

Hong Kong

St. Paul's Co-educational College was the first mixed-sex secondary school in Hong Kong. It was founded in 1915 as St. Paul's Girls' College. At the end of World War II, it was temporarily merged with St. Paul's College, which is a boys' school. When classes at the campus of St. Paul's College were resumed, it continued to be mixed and changed to its present name. Some other renowned mixed-sex secondary schools in town include Hong Kong Pui Ching Middle School, Queen Elizabeth School, and Tsuen Wan Government Secondary School. Most Hong Kong primary and secondary schools are mixed-sex, including government public schools, charter schools, and private schools.

Mongolia
Mongolia's first co-educational school, named Third School, opened in Ulaanbaatar on November 2, 1921. Subsequent schools have been co-educational and there are now no single-sex schools in Mongolia.

Pakistan

Pakistan is one of the many Muslim countries where most schools and colleges are single-gender although some schools and colleges, and most universities are coeducational. In schools that offer O levels and A levels, co-education is quite prevalent. After the independence of Pakistan in 1947, most universities were coeducational but the proportion of women was less than 5%. After the Islamization policies in the early 1980s, the government established Women's colleges and Women's universities to promote education among women who were hesitant to study in mixed-sex environment. Today, however, most universities and a large number of schools in urban areas are co-educational.

United Kingdom

Schools

In the United Kingdom the official term is mixed, and today most schools are mixed. A number of Quaker co-educational boarding schools were established before the 19th century.

The world's oldest co-educational school is thought to be Archbishop Tenison's Church of England High School, Croydon, established in 1714 in the United Kingdom, which admitted 10 boys and 10 girls from its opening, and remained co-educational thereafter. This is a day school only and still in existence.

The Scottish Dollar Academy was the first mixed-sex both day and boarding school in the UK. Founded in 1818, it is the oldest both boarding and day mixed-sex educational institution in the world still in existence. In England, the first non-Quaker mixed-sex public boarding school was Bedales School, founded in 1893 by John Haden Badley and becoming mixed in 1898. Ruckleigh School in Solihull was founded by Cathleen Cartland in 1909 as a non-denominational co-educational preparatory school many decades before others followed.  Many previously single-sex schools have begun to accept both sexes in the past few decades: for example, Clifton College began to accept girls in 1987.

Higher-education institutions

The first higher-education institution in the United Kingdom to allow women and men to enter on equal terms, and hence be admitted to academic degrees, was the University of Bristol (then established as University College, Bristol) in 1876.

Given their dual role as both boarding house and educational establishment, individual colleges at Oxford and Cambridge remained segregated for much longer. The first Oxford college to house both men and women was the graduate-only Nuffield College in 1937; the first five undergraduate colleges (Brasenose, Hertford, Jesus, St Catherine's, and Wadham) became mixed in 1974. The first mixed Cambridge college was the graduate-only Darwin from its foundation in 1964. Churchill, Clare, and King's Colleges were the first previously all-male colleges of the University of Cambridge to admit female undergraduates in 1972. Magdalene was the last all-male college to become mixed in 1988.

The last women's college in Oxford, St Hilda's, became mixed as of Michaelmas term 2008. Two colleges remain single-sex (women-only) at Cambridge: Murray Edwards (New Hall) and Newnham.

United States

The oldest extant mixed-sex institute of higher education in the United States is Oberlin College in Oberlin, Ohio, which was established in 1833. Mixed-sex classes were admitted to the preparatory department at Oberlin in 1833 and the college department in 1837. The first four women to receive bachelor's degrees in the United States earned them at Oberlin in 1841. Later, in 1862, the first black woman to receive a bachelor's degree (Mary Jane Patterson) also earned it from Oberlin College. Beginning in 1844, Hillsdale College became the next college to admit mixed-sex classes to four-year degree programs.

The University of Iowa became the first coeducational public or state university in the United States in 1855, and for much of the next century, public universities, and land grant universities in particular, would lead the way in mixed-sex higher education. There were also many private coeducational universities founded in the 19th century, especially west of the Mississippi River. East of the Mississippi, Wheaton College (Illinois) graduated its first female student in 1862. Bates College in Maine was open to women from its founding in 1855, and graduated its first female student in 1869. Cornell University and the University of Michigan each admitted their first female students in 1870.

Around the same time, single-sex women's colleges were also appearing. According to Irene Harwarth, Mindi Maline, and Elizabeth DeBra: "women's colleges were founded during the mid- and late-19th century in response to a need for advanced education for women at a time when they were not admitted to most institutions of higher education." Notable examples include the Seven Sisters colleges, of which Vassar College is now coeducational and Radcliffe College has merged with Harvard University. Other notable women's colleges that have become coeducational include Wheaton College in Massachusetts, Ohio Wesleyan Female College in Ohio, Skidmore College, Wells College, and Sarah Lawrence College in New York state, Pitzer College in California, Goucher College in Maryland and Connecticut College.

By 1900 the Briton Frederic Harrison said after visiting the United States that "The whole educational machinery of America ... open to women must be at least twentyfold greater than with us, and it is rapidly advancing to meet that of men both in numbers and quality". Where most of the history of coeducation in this period is a list of those moving toward the accommodation of both men and women at one campus, the state of Florida was an exception. In 1905, the Buckman Act was one of consolidation in governance and funding but separation in race and gender, with Florida State College for Women (since 1947, Florida State University) established to serve white females during this era, the campus that became what is now the University of Florida serving white males, and coeducation stipulated only for the campus serving black students at the site of what is now Florida A&M University. Florida did not return to coeducation at UF and FSU until after World War II, prompted by the drastically increased demands placed on the higher education system by veterans studying via GI Bill programs following World War II. The Buckman arrangements officially ended with new legislation guidelines passed in 1947.

Primary and secondary schools
Several early primary and secondary schools in the United States were single-sex.  Examples include Collegiate School, a boys' school operating in New York by 1638 (which remains a single-sex institution); and Boston Latin School, founded in 1635 (which did not become coeducational until 1972).

Nonetheless, mixed-sex education existed at the lower levels in the U.S. long before it extended to colleges.  For example, in 1787, the predecessor to Franklin & Marshall College in Lancaster, Pennsylvania, opened as a mixed-sex secondary school. Its first enrollment class consisted of 78 male and 36 female students.  Among the latter was Rebecca Gratz who would become an educator and philanthropist. However, the school soon began having financial problems and it reopened as an all-male institution.  Westford Academy in Westford, Massachusetts has operated as mixed-sex secondary school since its founding in 1792, making it the oldest continuously operating coed school in America. The oldest continuously operating coed boarding school in the United States is Westtown School, founded in 1799.

Colleges

A minister and a missionary founded Oberlin in 1833. Rev. John Jay Shipherd (minister) and Philo P. Stewart (missionary) became friends while spending the summer of 1832 together in nearby Elyria. They discovered a mutual disenchantment with what they saw as the lack of strong Christian principles among the settlers of the American West. They decided to establish a college and a colony based on their religious beliefs, "where they would train teachers and other Christian leaders for the boundless most desolate fields in the West".

Oberlin College and the surrounding community were dedicated to progressive causes and social justice. Though it did reluctantly what every other college refused to do at all, it was the first college to admit both women and African Americans as students. Women were not admitted to the baccalaureate program, which granted bachelor's degrees, until 1837; prior to that, they received diplomas from what was called the Ladies' Course. The initial 1837 students were Caroline Mary Rudd, Elizabeth Prall, Mary Hosford, and Mary Fletcher Kellogg.

The early success and achievement of women at Oberlin College persuaded many early women's rights leaders that coeducation would soon be accepted throughout the country. However, for quite a while, women sometimes were treated rudely by their male classmates. The prejudice of some male professors proved more unsettling. Many professors disapproved of the admission of women into their classes, citing studies that claimed that women were mentally unsuited for higher education, and because most would "just get married", they were using resources that, they believed, male students would use better. Some professors simply ignored the women students.

By the end of the 19th century 70% of American colleges were coeducational, although the state of Florida was a notable exception; the Buckman Act of 1905 imposed gender-separated white higher education at the University of Florida (men) and Florida State College for Women. (As there was only one state college for blacks, the future Florida A&M University, it admitted both men and women.) The white Florida campuses returned to coeducation in 1947, when the women's college became Florida State University and the University of Florida became coeducational. In the late 20th century, many institutions of higher learning that had been exclusively for people of one sex became coeducational.

Co-education fraternities

A number of Greek-letter student societies have either been established (locally or nationally) or expanded as co-ed fraternities.

"Coed" as slang
In American colloquial language, "coed" or "co-ed" is used to refer to a mixed school.
The word is also often used to describe a situation in which both sexes are integrated in any form (e.g., "The team is coed"). As a noun, the word "coed" is used to refer to a female student in a mixed gender school. The noun use is considered sexist and unprofessional by those who argue that it implies that including women somehow transforms what is "normal" (male-only "education") into something different ("coeducation"): technically both male and female students at a coeducational institution should be considered "coeds". Numerous professional organizations require that the gender-neutral term "student" be used instead of "coed" or, when gender is relevant to the context, that the term "female student" be substituted. Usage guides make no exception for any use of the noun to distinguish a female student at a coeducational institution from a student at a women-only institution: they do not even mention such use, possibly because such uses are comparatively rare and because the term cannot be distanced from its unacceptable uses.

Effects

For years, a question many educators, parents, and researchers have been asking is whether it is academically beneficial to teach boys and girls together or separately at school. Some argue that coeducation has primarily social benefits by allowing males and females of all ages to become more prepared for real-world situations and that students familiar with a single-sex setting could be less prepared, nervous, or uneasy.

However, some argue that at certain ages, students may be more distracted by the opposite sex in a coeducational setting, but others point out that to be based on the assumption that all students are heterosexual and that evidence is contradictory. There is evidence that girls may perform less well in traditionally male-dominated subjects such as the sciences when in a class with boys, but other research suggests that when the previous attainment is taken into account, that difference falls away. According to advocates of coeducation, without classmates of the opposite sex, students have social issues that may impact adolescent development. They argue that the absence of the opposite sex creates an unrealistic environment not duplicated in the real world. Some studies show that in classes that are separated by gender, male and female students work and learn on the same level as their peers, the stereotypical mentality of the teacher is removed, and girls are likely to have more confidence in the classroom than they would in a coeducational class.

See also

Co-educational boarding schools
Heterosociality
List of women's colleges
Men's colleges
Mixed-sex sports
Single-sex education
Unisex public toilet
Women's colleges

References

Further reading
 Fennell, Shailaja, and Madeleine Arnot. Gender Education and Equality in a Global Context: Conceptual frameworks and policy perspectives (Routledge, 2007)
 Goodman, Joyce, James C. Albisetti, and Rebecca Rogers, eds. Girls' Secondary Education in the Western World: From the 18th to the 20th Century (Palgrave Macmillan, 2010)
 Karnaouch, Denise. "Féminisme et coéducation en Europe avant 1914." Clio. Femmes, genre, histoire 18 (2003): 21–41.

England
 Albisetti, James C. "Un-learned lessons from the New World? English views of American coeducation and women's colleges, c. 1865–1910." History of Education 29.5 (2000): 473–489.
 Jackson, Carolyn, and Ian David Smith. "Poles apart? An exploration of single-sex and mixed-sex educational environments in Australia and England." Educational Studies 26.4 (2000): 409–422.

United States
 Hansot, Elisabeth, and David Tyack. "Gender in American public schools: Thinking institutionally." Signs (1988): 741–760. in JSTOR
 Lasser, Carol, ed. Educating men and women together: Coeducation in a changing world (1987), colleges
 Tyack, David, and Elizabeth Hansot. Learning together: A history of coeducation in American public schools (Russell Sage Foundation, 1992) on K-12 schools

External links

Rosenberg: Coeducation History
American Council for CoEducational Schooling

 
Educational environment
School types